Carto may refer to:

 Carto (video game)
 Cardiac electrophysiology
 Carto (company)
 R v Carto, lawsuit
 Willis Carto (1926–2015), political advocate